Mikko Ronkainen (born November 25, 1978 in Muurame) is a freestyle skier from Finland. He is a two-time World Champion (2001 and 2003) and won the moguls World Cup during the 2000–2001 season. At the 2006 Winter Olympics in Turin Ronkainen won a silver medal.

References

1978 births
Living people
People from Muurame
Finnish male freestyle skiers
Freestyle skiers at the 2002 Winter Olympics
Freestyle skiers at the 2006 Winter Olympics
Freestyle skiers at the 2010 Winter Olympics
Olympic freestyle skiers of Finland
Olympic silver medalists for Finland
Olympic medalists in freestyle skiing
Medalists at the 2006 Winter Olympics
Sportspeople from Central Finland